Poora Tehran Football Club was an Iranian football club based in Tehran, Iran.

History
Abdollah Soufiyani purchased the famous football club Kian F.C. and renamed it Poora. The club started operations in 1989.

Honours

Managers
 Ebrahim Ashtiani
 Fereydoun Mobini
 Ahmad Khodadad
 Mansour Pourheidari
 Parviz Mazloomi

References

Football clubs in Iran
Defunct football clubs in Iran
Association football clubs established in 1989
Sport in Tehran
1989 establishments in Iran